Sally Holdsworth (born 10 February 1944) is a British former professional tennis player.

Holdsworth, a Wimbledon junior semi-finalist, grew up in the town of Huddersfield. She began competing on the international tour in the 1960s and had her best Wimbledon performance in 1971 when she reached the round of 16 of the mixed doubles with John Paish.

Following her tennis career, Holdsworth ran a hotel in Barbados, then later served as an executive for the International Tennis Federation. In 2000 she organised the Parade of Champions which was held at Wimbledon to commemorate the club's 100th anniversary. She also established Wimbledon's Last Eight Club.

References

External links
 
 

1944 births
Living people
British female tennis players
English female tennis players
Tennis people from West Yorkshire
Sportspeople from Huddersfield